= Voting precinct =

Voting precinct can refer to one of the following:

- Electoral district
- Electoral precinct, a subdivision of an electoral district
- Polling station, where voters cast their ballots in elections
